Cape Lookout National Seashore preserves a 56-mile (90-km) long section of the Southern Outer Banks, or Crystal Coast, of North Carolina, USA, running from Ocracoke Inlet on the northeast to Beaufort Inlet on the southwest. Three undeveloped barrier islands make up the seashore - North and South Core Banks and Shackleford Banks. The seashore includes two historic villages on Core Banks, Shackleford's wild horses, and the Cape Lookout Lighthouse, which has a black-and-white diamond pattern. A visitor center for the seashore is located on Harkers Island.

The National Park Service, as part of their Centennial Initiative celebrating its 100th anniversary in 2016, is planning to rehabilitate the Lighthouse and restore the Cape Lookout and Portsmouth Village Historic Districts.

History 
The National Seashore was authorized on March 10, 1966. It was named a North Carolina Natural Heritage Area on May 23, 1986. The seashore was designated the Carolinian-South Atlantic Biosphere Reserve on June 16, 1986. Damage was light but flooding and beach erosion affected this lookout. On August 27, 2011, Hurricane Irene made landfall near Cape Lookout as a Category 1 storm with 85 mph sustained winds. Hurricane Arthur also made landfall near Cape Lookout as a Category 2 storm with 100 mph sustained winds.

Laws
The Corolla Wild Horses Protection Act (H.R. 126;113th Congress), if passed, would take wild horses from herds on the Cape Lookout National Seashore and introduced them to the herds in the Currituck National Wildlife Refuge in order to ensure genetic viability.

Map

Climate
According to the Trewartha climate classification system, Cape Lookout National Seashore, North Carolina has a humid subtropical climate with hot and humid summers, cool winters and year-around precipitation (Cfak). Cfak climates are characterized by all months having an average mean temperature > 32.0 °F (> 0.0 °C), at least eight months with an average mean temperature ≥ 50.0 °F (≥ 10.0 °C), at least one month with an average mean temperature ≥ 71.6 °F (≥ 22.0 °C) and no significant precipitation difference between seasons. During the summer months in Cape Lookout National Seashore, a cooling afternoon sea breeze is present on most days, but episodes of extreme heat and humidity can occur with heat index values ≥ 100 °F (≥ 38 °C). Cape Lookout National Seashore is prone to hurricane strikes, particularly during the Atlantic hurricane season which extends from June 1 through November 30, sharply peaking from late August through September. During the winter months, episodes of cold and wind can occur with wind chill values < 10 °F (< -12 °C). The plant hardiness zone at Core Sound in Cape Lookout National Seashore is 8b with an average annual extreme minimum air temperature of 16.6 °F (-8.6 °C). The average seasonal (Dec-Mar) snowfall total is < 2 inches (< 5 cm), and the average annual peak in nor'easter activity is in February.

Ecology

According to the A. W. Kuchler U.S. potential natural vegetation types, Cape Lookout National Seashore, North Carolina would have a dominant vegetation type of Live oak/Sea Oats Uniola paniculata (90) with a dominant vegetation form of Coastal Prairie (20).

Wildlife

Bibliography
 The National Parks: Index 2001–2003. Washington: U.S. Department of the Interior.

Notes

External links 

 Official NPS website: Cape Lookout National Seashore
 Cape Lookout Studies Program
 An entry by the International Dark-Sky Association

Biosphere reserves of the United States
Protected areas of Carteret County, North Carolina
National Seashores of the United States
Outer Banks
Protected areas established in 1966
National Park Service areas in North Carolina
1966 establishments in North Carolina